Rhaphiostylis is a genus of flowering plants belonging to the family Metteniusaceae.

Its native range is Tropical Africa, Madagascar.

Species:

Rhaphiostylis beninensis 
Rhaphiostylis cordifolia 
Rhaphiostylis elegans 
Rhaphiostylis ferruginea 
Rhaphiostylis fusca 
Rhaphiostylis minima 
Rhaphiostylis ovatifolia 
Rhaphiostylis parvifolia 
Rhaphiostylis poggei 
Rhaphiostylis preussii 
Rhaphiostylis subsessilifolia

References

Metteniusaceae
Asterid genera